Yaropolk III Yaroslavich (after 1174 – after 1212 / before 1223) was a Rus' prince (a member of the Rurik dynasty). He was prince of Novgorod (1197).

His life 
Yaropolk was the younger son of Yaroslav Vsevolodovich (who was the prince of Starodub or Chernigov when Yaropolk was born), by his wife Irene.

In 1196, prince Vsevolod Yurevich of Suzdalia refused to grant the citizens of Novgorod their request to replace his appointee Yaroslav Vladimirovich with his son or some other prince. Failing to have their way, they used their recently confirmed right to invite a prince of their own choice. On November 26, they evicted Yaroslav Vladimirovich and sent a delegation to Yaroslav Vsevolodovich in Chernigov, who promised to give them his son Yaropolk.

According to a number of late chronicles, Yaroslav Vsevolodovich could not send his son because the Olgovichi (the dynasty of Chernigov) were embroiled in a conflict with Monomakh’s dynasty. Since Yaroslav Vsevolodovich had been reconciled with Vsevolod Yurevich, the princes of Monomakh’s dynasty who prevented him from sending his son must have been the two Rostislavichi (David Rostislavich of Smolensk and Rurik Rostislavich of Kiev). Nevertheless, early in 1197 they were pacified to judge from the news that Yaropolk finally arrived in Novgorod at the end of March.

However, after six months the Novgorodians expelled Yaropolk and recalled Yaroslav Vladimirovich. Although his sojourn in Novgorod was brief, a number of lead seals that were found there have been attributed to him.

At the beginning of 1212, Yaropolk’s cousin grand prince Vsevolod IV Svyatoslavich of Kiev waged war against the Rostislavichi, and kicked them out of Rus'. Vsevolod Svyatoslavich probably gave Vyshgorod to Yaropolk’s brother, Rostislav Yaroslavich, and Yaropolk joined his brother. In June 1212, the Rostislavichi (Mstislav Romanovich and prince Mstislav Mstislavich of Novgorod) launched a major offensive against Vsevolod Svyatoslavich to reclaim their lands. Vsevolod Svyatoslavich and his brothers confronted the attackers at Vyshgorod, but the Rostislavichi occupied the town and captured Rostislav and Yaropolk.

When all the princes assembled in Kiev in the spring of 1223, Mikhail Vsevolodovich was the second in seniority among the Olgovichi which suggests that Yaropolk and Rostislav had died by that time.

Ancestors

Footnotes

Sources 
Dimnik, Martin: The Dynasty of Chernigov - 1146-1246; Cambridge University Press, 2003, Cambridge; .

Olgovichi family
Princes of Novgorod
Eastern Orthodox monarchs